Michael Patrick Coyle is an American composer.

Michael Patrick Coyle is a composer/arranger in Minneapolis and also the executive producer for an independent, multi-media production company based in New York, Munich, and Warsaw. He is the former composer-in-residence for the Manhattan Performance Group and the Cottage Theater in New York City, and was the editor of Stagebill magazine at Lincoln Center and Carnegie Hall. Michael's works have been featured on television, film, and stage, and in art installations in New York City, Los Angeles, Philadelphia, Boston, and Minneapolis, and Madison, WI.

He works in a wide variety of styles, but primarily enjoys writing for instrumental chamber ensembles and orchestra. Most evident in Michael's music is a rich use of both traditional and extended harmony balanced with sections of harmonic ambiguity and atonality. He believes that the combination of tonality and atonality is critical to the appreciation of both. By his own admission, he is obsessed with novel variation in both tone color and texture. He has been recognized as an adept and imaginative orchestrator. He works with both acoustic and electronic instruments in order to have access to as wide a palette of raw sound as possible.

In addition to music, Michael has an avid interest in science and material experimentation and in the mid-1980s accepted a position as Production Manager for McHugh-Rollins Associates, a properties and special effects design firm in New York City. While in that position he oversaw the special effects production of such large Broadway shows as The Phantom of the Opera and Les Misérables and implemented the effects for Ingmar Bergman's production of Hamlet at the Brooklyn Academy of Music, as well as many other stage productions and films.

Michael did his undergraduate studies at the Eastman School of Music, graduate work at the New England Conservatory of Music, the Institute of Audio Research, New York University, and the University of Minnesota. Michael plays the piano, trombone, and a wide variety of electronic instruments. His greatest musical influences and mentors have been: Robert Bailey, James Hepokoski, Daniel Pinkham, Jan Gorbaty, Dominic Argento, and Henry Schmidt.

Michael currently resides in Minneapolis, where, in addition to his work as a composer and arranger, he occasionally performs on the piano and trombone.

Michael is an active member of the American Composers Forum.

Recent works 
 On the Departure of a Beloved Friend - for French horn choir and tuba. Written in memoriam Larry Jonas. Performed by the Eastman Horn Choir, March 26, 2017. Previously performed at the University of New Mexico, and the International Horn Society Symposium, 2016.
 Jesus Blue - for large orchestra
 DX - for viola, clarinet, trombone, string bass, and percussion 
 Intervals I - for small wind ensemble, piano, and percussion 
 Intervals II - for piano, violin, and viola 
 Small Village Large Tree - for chamber orchestra 
 Bruckneurosis - for large orchestra 
 The Barking Wizards of Middleview - for chamber orchestra 
 Trio for violin, viola, and piano 
 Four Divas and one Climax, for cello quartet
 Tänzchen für Vier" - for violin, clarinet, piano, marimba and vibes - winner of the annual Zeitgeist/American Composers Forum competition, premiered by Zeitgeist, St. Paul, MN 
webpage with links to samples

Contact and more information 
Official website with musical samples
American Composers Forum Bio Page
Facebook Page
List of Eastman School of Music people - List of Eastman School of Music Alumni

References 

1957 births
20th-century classical composers
21st-century classical composers
Living people
Eastman School of Music alumni
University of Minnesota alumni
Male classical composers
20th-century male musicians
21st-century male musicians